Thomas Frances Marshall  (April 13, 1793 – March 28, 1853), was a brigadier general of Volunteers in the United States Army during the Mexican–American War.

A nephew of Chief Justice John Marshall, Thomas Marshall served in the Kentucky legislature several times between 1817 and 1844, one of those terms as Speaker of the House. At the outbreak of the Mexican–American War, he was commissioned by President James K. Polk as a Brigadier General of Volunteers, and commanded the Kentucky brigade under General John E. Wool. After his return to Kentucky, he was murdered by a tenant at his home in Lewis County.

References

 
 

1793 births
1853 deaths
American military personnel of the Mexican–American War
People from Mason County, Kentucky
United States Army generals